Harriet Sansom Harris (born January 8, 1955) is an American actress known for her theater performances and for her portrayals of Bebe Glazer on Frasier and Felicia Tilman on Desperate Housewives. 

Harris won a Tony Award in 2002 as a Featured Actress in a Musical for her performance in Thoroughly Modern Millie. In addition to television and theater, she has made various film appearances, including Memento, Addams Family Values, Nurse Betty and Phantom Thread.

Early life
Harris was born in Fort Worth, Texas, one of two daughters. On her mother's side, she is a descendant of one of the brothers of Marion Sansom, a 20th-century rancher and civic leader. Sansom Park is named after him. She began acting as a youngster, attending Arlington Heights High School. She attended Fort Worth Country Day School and graduated from there in 1973. At age 17, she was accepted at the Juilliard School's Drama Division (1973–77, Group 6) where she earned a Bachelor of Fine Arts degree.

After graduation from Juilliard, she joined John Houseman's touring repertory company The Acting Company, where she stayed for three years. During this time, she performed in productions of Shakespeare's King Lear and Romeo and Juliet, Antigone, and Mother Courage and Her Children.

Career

Theatre
Harris worked extensively on and Off-Broadway, including a 1989 performance at Second Stage Theatre in What a Man Weighs. One of her breakthrough performances was in the original cast of Paul Rudnick's Jeffrey, in which she was the sole female cast member.

In 1992, Harris made her Broadway debut in Four Baboons Adoring the Sun. That same year, she was nominated for a Drama Desk Award for her portrayal in the Off-Broadway play Bella, Belle of Byelorussia. In 1993, she received a second Drama Desk nomination for her performance in Jeffrey. She won both a Drama Desk and Tony Award in 2002 as a Featured Actress in a Musical for playing the role of Mrs. Meers in Thoroughly Modern Millie.

Since 2005, Harris has appeared in various stage productions across the United States. In summer 2006, she appeared as Vera Charles in the Kennedy Center's production of Mame opposite Christine Baranski in the title role. In early 2007, Harris appeared as Amanda Wingfield in the production of The Glass Menagerie at the Guthrie Theater. In summer 2007, she appeared on Broadway in the revival of the John Van Druten comedy Old Acquaintance as Mildred Watson Drake with Margaret Colin at the American Airlines Theatre.

In 2007, Harris returned to Broadway and joined the cast of the musical Cry-Baby, based on the John Waters film of the same name. The show previewed on Broadway at the Marquis Theatre on March 15, 2008 and opened on April 24. The production was nominated for Best Musical at the 2008 Tony Awards, and closed on June 22, 2008. She returned to Broadway as the Evil Stepmother in Cinderella in 2013. In 2015, Harris took on the role as the mother of the groom-to-be (who secretly wishes that her son was gay) in the musical comedy It Shoulda Been You, sparring with Tyne Daly who played the mother of the bride-to-be. Harris played the role of Fanny, head of the Cavendish family, in the musical The Royal Family of Broadway at the Barrington Stage Company, Massachusetts, from June to July 2018.

Television
Harris's work in Jeffrey led to numerous television guest appearances, including a recurring role on the sitcom Frasier as Frasier's conniving agent Bebe Glazer from 1993 to 2004. Harris co-starred in several short-lived series, including The 5 Mrs. Buchanans, Union Square, The Beast, and It's All Relative, but played notable guest roles on multiple hit series, including Ghost Whisperer, Murphy Brown, Ally McBeal, Six Feet Under, Frasier and Ellen. Among them was her performance on The X-Files in the 1993 episode "Eve" as Dr. Sally Kendrick and her "Eve" clones. In 2006, she starred in the Sci-Fi Channel miniseries The Lost Room as Margaret Milne.

In 1989, Harris appeared on the last episode of Highway to Heaven, playing Ruth Ann Kifer in the episode "Merry Christmas From Grandpa" - season 5, episode 13.

Harris played Martha Huber's sister Felicia Tilman on the ABC drama series Desperate Housewives in 2004. The narrative saw Felicia arrive on Wisteria Lane to discover who was behind her sister's murder. She soon came to the conclusion that Paul Young was responsible, but before she could act out her revenge, she was attacked by his son Zach Young. To finish the story-line, she returned for the second season in 2005, which followed Felicia as she planned her final acts of revenge against Paul. She departed at the end of the second series by faking her own murder, framing Paul, and sending him to prison. She returned to Desperate Housewives for the series' seventh season. On playing the character Harris commented:

In 2018, Harris appeared as Madelyn in the American Horror Story: Apocalypse episode "Sojourn", and as Adriana in the Dynasty episode "Queen of Cups". She appeared in the Netflix drama series Ratched.

Filmography

Film

Television

Awards and nominations

References

External links
 
 

1955 births
Actresses from Texas
American stage actresses
American television actresses
Drama Desk Award winners
Juilliard School alumni
Living people
Actresses from Fort Worth, Texas
Tony Award winners
20th-century American actresses
21st-century American actresses